Organoantimony chemistry is the chemistry of compounds containing a carbon to antimony (Sb) chemical bond. Relevant oxidation states are Sb(V) and Sb(III). The toxicity of antimony limits practical application in organic chemistry.

Organoantimony(V) chemistry
Antimony compounds of the type R5Sb (stiboranes) can be synthesised from trivalent Sb precursors:
Ph3Sb  +  Cl2  →  Ph3SbCl2 
Ph3SbCl2   + 2 PhLi  →  Ph5Sb

Asymmetric compounds can also be obtained through the stibonium ion:
R5Sb + X2 → [R4Sb]+[X]
[R4Sb]+[X] + R'MgX → R4R'Sb   
 
Just as in the related organobismuth compounds (same group 15),  organoantimony(V) compounds form onium compounds and ate complexes.

Pentaphenylantimony decomposes at 200 °C to triphenylstibine and biphenyl. It forms a trigonal bipyramidal molecular geometry. In the related Me5Sb all methyl protons are equivalent at -100 °C in proton NMR. Compounds of the type R4SbX tend to form dimers.

Organoantimony(III) chemistry
Compounds of the type R3Sb (stibines) can be accessed by reaction of antimony trichloride with organolithium or Grignard reagents. 
SbCl3  + 3 RLi (or RMgCl)  →  R3Sb

Typical reactions are:
R3Sb  +  Br2  →  R3SbBr2
R3Sb  +  O2  →  R3SbO
R3Sb  +  Na + NH3  →  R2SbNa
R3Sb  +  B2H6  →  R3Sb·BH3

Stibanes are weak Lewis acids and therefore ate complexes are not encountered. On the other hand, they have good donor properties and are therefore widely used in coordination chemistry. R3Sb compounds are more air-sensitive than the  R5Sb counterparts.

Antimony Metallocenes are known as well:
14SbI3 + 3 (Cp*Al)4   →  [2Cp*Sb]+[AlI4]− + 8Sb + 6 AlI3
The Cp*-Sb-Cp* angle is 154°.

The cyclic compound stibole, a structural analog of pyrrole, has not been isolated, but substituted derivatives known as stiboles are known.

Organoantimony(II) chemistry
Distibines have a Sb-Sb single bond and are of some interest as thermochromic materials. For example, tetramethyldistibine is colorless as a gas, yellow as a liquid, red as solid just below the melting point of 18.5 °C and again yellow well below the melting point.

See also
 Lewis acidic antimony compounds

References